Liam Hudson (1933–2005) was a British social psychologist and author. Richard Webster writes that Hudson's work provides the best introduction to "the general question of the psychological correlates of intellectual specialisation", and praises his Contrary Imaginations and Frames of Mind as "rich storehouses of evidence, insight and careful inference."

Books
 Contrary Imaginations: A Psychological Study of the English Schoolboy (1967)
 Frames of Mind: Ability, Perception and Self-Perception in the Arts and the Sciences (1968)
 The Ecology of Human Intelligence (1970, as editor)
 The Cult of the Fact (1972)

See also
 Life Against Death

References

Sources
 www.timesonline.co.uk

1933 births
2005 deaths
Social psychologists
People educated at Whitgift School